Sacred Hearts and Fallen Angels: The Gram Parsons Anthology is a compilation of Gram Parsons's albums from 1968 to 1976 and was released in 2001. It features segments from the International Submarine Band, The Byrds, The Flying Burrito Brothers, and his solo albums, and includes unreleased live tracks and non-LP tracks.  Emmylou Harris, Chris Robinson of The Black Crowes, and Chris Hillman and Roger McGuinn of The Byrds contributed to the liner notes.

Track listing

Disc 1

	"Blue Eyes" - The International Submarine Band
	"Luxury Liner" - The International Submarine Band
	"Do You Know How It Feels to Be Lonesome?" - The International Submarine Band
	"I Must Be Somebody Else You've Known" - The International Submarine Band
	"Miller's Cave" - The International Submarine Band
	"Knee Deep in the Blues" - The International Submarine Band
	"Hickory Wind" - The Byrds
	"You're Still on My Mind" - The Byrds
	"The Christian Life" - The Byrds
	"You Don't Miss Your Water" - The Byrds
	"One Hundred Years from Now" - The Byrds
	"Christine's Tune (Devil in Disguise)" - The Flying Burrito Brothers
	"Sin City" - The Flying Burrito Brothers
	"Do Right Woman" - The Flying Burrito Brothers
	"The Dark End of the Street" - The Flying Burrito Brothers
	"Wheels" - The Flying Burrito Brothers
	"Juanita" - The Flying Burrito Brothers
	"Hot Burrito #1" - The Flying Burrito Brothers
	"Hot Burrito #2" - The Flying Burrito Brothers
	"High Fashion Queen" - The Flying Burrito Brothers
	"Older Guys" - The Flying Burrito Brothers
	"Cody, Cody" - The Flying Burrito Brothers
	"Wild Horses" - The Flying Burrito Brothers
	"Sing Me Back Home" (by Merle Haggard) - The Flying Burrito Brothers

Disc 2
	"To Love Somebody" (by the Bee Gees) - The Flying Burrito Brothers
	"Still Feeling Blue" - Gram Parsons
	"We'll Sweep Out the Ashes in the Morning" - Gram Parsons
	"A Song for You" - Gram Parsons
	"Streets of Baltimore" - Gram Parsons
	"She" - Gram Parsons
	"The New Soft Shoe" - Gram Parsons
	"Kiss the Children" - Gram Parsons
	"How Much I've Lied" - Gram Parsons
	"Drug Store Truck Drivin' Man" - Gram Parsons & The Fallen Angels
	"That's All It Took" - Gram Parsons & The Fallen Angels
	"California Cotton Fields" - Gram Parsons & The Fallen Angels
	"Return of the Grievous Angel" (Remix) - Gram Parsons
	"Hearts on Fire" - Gram Parsons
	"Brass Buttons" - Gram Parsons
	"$1000 Dollar Wedding" - Gram Parsons
	"Love Hurts" - Gram Parsons
	"Ooh Las Vegas" - Gram Parsons
	"In My Hour of Darkness" - Gram Parsons
	"Brand New Heartache" - Gram Parsons
	"Sleepless Nights" - Gram Parsons
	"The Angels Rejoiced Last Night" - Gram Parsons

References

2000 compilation albums
Gram Parsons compilation albums
Rhino Records compilation albums